The United States national rugby sevens team got off to a strong start in the 2018–19 World Rugby Sevens Series. The team reached the finals in Dubai, South Africa, New Zealand, and Australia, the first time the U.S. had reached four consecutive finals and was ranked joint first in the overall Series after the first four legs. In the fifth leg, the U.S. won beating Samoa 27–0. This was the U.S.’s second straight USA Sevens win, giving them sole possession of first place in the Sevens World Series. The U.S. remained in first place for several more tournaments, but consecutive semifinal losses to Fiji in the last two tournaments in London and Paris meant that Fiji won the Series with the U.S. finishing second. The U.S. overall had its best season ever — the second-place finish beating their previous best of fifth. Additionally, qualifying for five consecutive tournament finals as well as reaching the semifinals in all ten tournaments were U.S. records. Carlin Isles scored 52 tries, ranked first overall among all players.

Standings
The following shows the standings for the 2018–19 series for the 15 core teams. The top four finish by the U.S. qualified the team for the 2020 Olympics.

Source: World Rugby

{| class="wikitable" style="font-size:92%;"
|-  
!colspan=2| Legend
|-
|style="width:4.5em;"|No colour
|Core team in 2018–19 and re-qualified as a core team for the 2019–20 World Rugby Sevens Series
|- 
|style="background:#fcc;"|Pink
|Relegated as the lowest placed core team at the end of the 2018–19 series
|-
|colspan=2 style="border-left:3px solid #06f;"| Qualified to the 2020 Olympic Sevens as one of the four highest placed eligible teams from the 2018–19 series.
|-
|}

World Series results by tournament

U.S. vs Fiji
Fiji and the U.S. were the top two teams at the end of the Series and during the final rounds of the Series. The teams met during seven of the ten Series tournaments. All their matchups were during the knockout rounds; they never met during pool play. The U.S. won the first matchup, and Fiji winning all of the other six matches.

Player season statistics
The following table shows the leading players for the U.S. at the conclusion of the 2018–19 World Rugby Sevens Series. Carlin Isles led all players on the Series with 52 tries and 48 clean breaks. Madison Hughes ranked second in the Series with 299 points. Ben Pinkelman ranked third with 191 carries. Stephen Tomasin ranked fifth with 101 tackles.

Source: World Rugby website.

Player and coach Series awards

Three U.S. players made the seven-man World Series Dream Team:

2018–19 Coach of the World Series: Mike Friday, U.S. head coach.

2019 USA Sevens

The United States won the 2019 USA Sevens by beating Samoa 27–0 in the final. This was the first second time that the United States won its home tournament (2018 was the first). USA's Ben Pinkelman was named Player of the Final.

 Substitutes: Brett Thompson, Maceo Brown, Kevon Williams, Marcus Tupuola, and Ben Broselle.
 Unavailable due to injury: Danny Barrett, Perry Baker

References

2018–19
United States
2019 in American rugby union